Invictus International School is a co-educational international school based in Singapore that offers kindergarten, primary and secondary education. It was co-founded by John Fearon and Dr Mark Hon in 2015, and promotes itself as an affordable option for international students. The school is amongst one of the brands owned by Sing-Ed Global Schoolhouse (Sing-Ed). From October 2021, the Invictus group is wholly-owned by Sing-Ed.

The school has campuses in Singapore, Hong Kong, Thailand, China and Cambodia, where it adopts the International Primary Curriculum (IPC) and International Middle Years Curriculum (IMYC). In the upper years, students are offered to sit for the IGCSE and Cambridge A Level Examinations.

References 

International schools in Singapore
Educational institutions established in 2015
2015 establishments in Singapore